Space Hero is an upcoming reality television show contest that plans to send a winner to the International Space Station. The show is scheduled to air in 2023. Space Hero was founded by Deborah Sass and Thomas Reemer.  In 2020, NASA confirmed it was in discussions regarding the show. Sass and Reemer are said to be hoping the show will encourage interest in privatized space travel. The show is being developed with support from spaceflight company Axiom Space. 24 contestants from any country in the world will be selected. The gender ratio will be half male and half female, with the same ratio for those contestants from emerging and developing countries.

Development 
The show is currently in pre-production, and will take on a reality television show format with 24 contestants who will compete for a grand prize of free travel via SpaceX Crew Dragon to the International Space Station. In 2021, Miriam Kramer of Axios News noted co-founder Sass intended for the program to open up for contestant applications "in the next six to eight months". While the contestants have yet to be confirmed, in March 2022 Reemer and Sass announced a partnership with a large digital media company, One Digital Entertainment, to commence "product strategy, regional development, media allowances and brand marketing for the world's first ever global casting show".

References

Upcoming television series
2020s American reality television series